Stoltenberg's First Cabinet governed Norway between 17 March 2000 and 19 October 2001. The Labour Party cabinet was led by Prime Minister Jens Stoltenberg. It had the following composition.

Cabinet members

|}

State Secretaries

References
Jens Stoltenbergs første regjering 2000-2001 - Regjeringen.no

Notes

Stoltenberg 1
Stoltenberg 1
2000 establishments in Norway
2001 disestablishments in Norway
Cabinets established in 2000
Cabinets disestablished in 2001